Jeyranbatan reservoir is a reservoir in the Absheron Rayon in eastern part of  Azerbaijan. It is located between Baku and Sumgayit cities, next to Ceyranbatan settlement 20 km away from Baku. In Azerbaijani Jeyranbatan means "the place where the gazelle has drowned" which refers to an ancient legend related to the naming of city of Sumgayit.

Overview
The reservoir was built in 1958 in order to provide drinking water to increasing population of Baku and Sumgayit. The reservoir gets the water from Samur-Absheron channel which is fed by three inflowing rivers Samurçay, Vəlvələçay and Qudiyalçay.
Due to containment of drinking water, a sanitary protection zone was founded around the reservoir in 1960. In 2001, the first sanitary zone was expanded and fenced off for protection of the reservoir lake. The project also included foresting and cleaning of water channels in order to improve the ecology of the lake. The reservoir also has two sets of big water pumping stations.

History 
The reservoir was built on the basis of a project created at the beginning of the 20th century by the English engineer William Lindley. The main idea of the project was the transfer of water from the Samur River to the reservoir, where the water was to be cleaned and delivered to the cities. Only half a century later, work began on the basis of this project. First the Samur-Dyavachi channel was extended to the Absheron Peninsula. At the same time, a reservoir with a volume of 186 million cubic meters was created in place of the lakes, Devyayatagy and Jeyranbatan and in 1957 reservoir filling began. In the same year a complex of water treatment plants was built. The first installation of the complex was commissioned in 1961, the second in 1966, and the third in 1978. After putting the second and third plants into operation, the water supply of Sumgayit, Baki villages and the eastern part of the capital was significantly improved. In 1998–2002, overhaul of water treatment plants was carried out. As part of the repair, the first and second installations were reconstructed.

See also 
 Rivers and lakes in Azerbaijan
 Mingachevir reservoir
 Shamkir reservoir

References

Absheron District
Reservoirs built in the Soviet Union
Reservoirs in Azerbaijan